The Altoona Mountain Citys were a professional baseball franchise that played in Altoona, Pennsylvania in 1884.  The Mountain Citys were a charter member of the Union Association, but folded after 25 games with a 6–19 record. They were alternately known as the Ottawas, after the local history of the Ottawa people in the 17th and 18th centuries.  At the start of the season, they were also known by the nickname Altoona Pride, and were advertised as the Famous Altoonas.  By the season's end, they were known as the Altoona Unfortunates.

History
For its roughly six weeks of play, the Altoona Mountain Citys were managed by Ed Curtis and played in Altoona's Columbia Park. Among its roster, catcher Jerrie Moore and shortstop Germany Smith were two of its best players. John Murphy and Jim Brown were the team's ace pitchers.

When Henry Lucas, president of the newest major league, the Union Association, could only find seven teams for his league, he convinced the team, then part of the Inter-State Association, to join the league, with the promise that the Pennsylvania Railroad would provide some backing.

The Mountain Citys began the  season by playing the top teams in the league, the St. Louis Maroons and the Cincinnati Outlaw Reds, and losing 11 straight. The Altoona team's performance against the Maroons was especially hideous; they gave up 92 runs and made 53 errors.  After finally winning their first game on May 10, the Mountain Citys went 5–8 the rest of the way before folding. The team's final game was on May 31, 1884. The team was a disaster – attendance was as low as 200 on some games, and averaged slightly more than 1,000 per home game, low figures even for those times.

The Altoona Curve, Double-A Affiliate of the Pittsburgh Pirates, saluted the Mountain Citys by changing their names to "The Altoona Mountain City" for every Thursday game.

1884 season

Season standings

Record vs. opponents

Opening Day lineup

Roster

Player stats

Batting

Starters by position
Note: Pos = Position; G = Games played; AB = At bats; H = Hits; Avg. = Batting average; HR = Home runs

Other batters
Note: G = Games played; AB = At bats; H = Hits; Avg. = Batting average; HR = Home runs

Pitching

Starting pitchers
Note: G = Games pitched; IP = Innings pitched; W = Wins; L = Losses; ERA = Earned run average; SO = Strikeouts

Relief pitchers
Note: G = Games pitched; W = Wins; L = Losses; SV = Saves; ERA = Earned run average; SO = Strikeouts

References

External links
Altoona Mountain City team page at Baseball Reference
Altoona Mountain Citys at SABR

Altoona, Pennsylvania
Union Association baseball teams
Defunct baseball teams in Pennsylvania
Defunct sports teams in Pennsylvania
Baseball teams established in 1884
Baseball teams disestablished in 1884
1884 establishments in Pennsylvania
1884 disestablishments in Pennsylvania